Marguerite Deprez-Audebert (born 17 May 1952) is a French politician of the Democratic Movement (MoDem) who has been serving as a member of the French National Assembly since the 2017 elections, representing the department of Pas-de-Calais.

Political career
In parliament, Deprez-Audebert serves as member of the Committee on Economic Affairs and the Committee on European Affairs. She has also been a member of the Committee on Sustainable Development and Spatial Planning. In addition to her committee assignments, she is a member of the French parliamentary friendship groups with Germany and Vietnam.

Political positions
In July 2019, Deprez-Audebert voted in favor of the French ratification of the European Union’s Comprehensive Economic and Trade Agreement (CETA) with Canada.

References

Living people
Deputies of the 15th National Assembly of the French Fifth Republic
Women members of the National Assembly (France)
Democratic Movement (France) politicians
21st-century French women politicians
1952 births
Members of Parliament for Pas-de-Calais